Toshevtsi (Bulgarian: Тошевци) is a village in north-western Bulgaria. It is located in the municipality of Gramada, Vidin Province.

As of December 2013 the village has a population of 162.

References
 http://www.guide-bulgaria.com/nw/vidin/gramada/toshevtsi

Villages in Vidin Province